Supayagyi (1854 – 25 February 1912), also spelt Suphayagyi, was the penultimate chief queen consort of the Konbaung dynasty, and was married to Thibaw Min, the last monarch in the dynasty.

Early life 
Supayagyi, born in 1854 as Hteiksu Phayagyi, was the eldest of three daughters between King Mindon and Hsinbyumashin. She was a full-blooded sister of Supayalat and Supayalay. She received the appanage of Mong Nawng and was therefore known as the Princess of Mong Nawng, with the royal title of Susīriratanamaṅgaladevī.

Coronation 

The ambitious Hsinbyumashin, after placing Thibaw on the throne, offered her oldest daughter Hteik Supayagyi, to be his queen. During the royal aggamahesi coronation, Supayalat pushed in next to her sister to be anointed queen at the same time, breaking ancient custom. Her sister's marriage was never consummated, and Supayalat was said to have forced monogamy on a Burmese king for the first and the last time in history, even though Thibaw also subsequently married her youngest sister Hteik Supayalay, Princess of Yamethin.

Exile 

The royal family's reign lasted just seven years when Thibaw Min was defeated in the Third Anglo-Burmese War and forced to abdicate by the British in 1885. On 25 November 1885 they were taken away in a covered carriage, leaving Mandalay Palace by the southern gate of the walled city along the streets lined by British soldiers and their wailing subjects, to the River Irrawaddy where a steamboat called Thuriya (Sun) awaited. Supayagyi and the queen mother were sent to Tavoy (now Dawei). She died with buddhist num life on 25 February 1912 in Mingun after her mother, who died in 1900. Her remains were interred in the southern section of Shwedagon Pagoda in modern-day Yangon.

References

See also
Supayalat
Thibaw Min
Konbaung dynasty

1854 births
1912 deaths
Burmese Buddhists
Chief queens consort of Konbaung dynasty
Year of death unknown